Both Members of This Club is an oil painting by George Bellows. It hangs in the National Gallery of Art in Washington DC. It dates to 1909 and measures .

The Gallery writes, Both Members of This Club was inspired by the fights Bellows attended at Tom Sharkey's Athletic Club in New York. At the time, public boxing matches were illegal in the city. Private organizations like Sharkey's made prospective fighters temporary members of the "club" on the night of the event to circumvent the law." 

Bellows painted the work in October 1909, as a follow on to Stag at Sharkey's

References

1909 paintings
Paintings by George Bellows
Boxing in art
Sports paintings
Collections of the National Gallery of Art